The Bilbao Metropolitan Area (in Basque: Bilbo Handia, in Spanish: Área metropolitana de Bilbao) is the metropolitan area or continuous urban area based around the city of Bilbao, in the Basque Country, Spain. It comprises the city of Bilbao, the 25 municipalities that make the comarca of Greater Bilbao plus ten other surrounding municipalities, all of them in the province of Biscay.

It is the fifth most populated metropolitan area in Spain Almost 80% of the population of Biscay and 43% of the population of the Basque Country is concentrated in the Greater Bilbao area or the wider metropolitan area. The metropolitan area's municipalities, are defined by the Basque Country's Territorial Directives Other six satellite cities exist within the province of Biscay and the community of Cantabria, where commute between the cities and the metropolitan area in common.

Constituent parts 

The metropolitan area of Bilbao can be divided into the municipalities inside Greater Bilbao and the ones located outside. Greater Bilbao is a comarca, an administrative division of the province of Biscay and smaller than the wider metropolitan area. Plus, six municipalities outside the actual metropolitan area are considered satellite cities.

Greater Bilbao 

Within the comarca of Greater Bilbao there are 25 municipalities corresponding to the city of Bilbao and the conurbation next to it, conformed by municipalities located along the Nervión River.

 Abanto Zierbena
 Alonsotegi
 Arrigorriaga
 Barakaldo
 Basauri
 Bilbao
 Derio
 Zierbena
 Etxebarri
 Erandio
 Galdakao
 Getxo
 Larrabetzu
 Leioa
 Lezama
 Loiu
 Muskiz
 Ortuella
 Portugalete
 Santurtzi
 Sestao
 Sondika
 Trapagaran
 Zamudio
 Zaratamo

Wider Metropolitan Area of Bilbao 

These 10 municipalities are located outside the comarca of Greater Bilbao but inside the wider metropolitan area.

Satellite towns 

These municipalities are located both outside Greater Bilbao and outside the metropolitan area itself, but they are considered "satellite towns". All of them, with the exception of Castro Urdiales which is located in the community of Cantabria (outside the community of the Basque Country) and Laudio which is located in Álava, are located in the province of Biscay, on different comarcas.

Amorebieta-Etxano
Castro Urdiales
Durango
Laudio
Lemoa
Mungia

Structure 

The area is usually structured into different zones:

The city of Bilbao: The main business and services hub of the metropolitan area, with roughly 40% of its population.
The left bank: Traditionally an industrial, port, and manufacturing zone. It includes Barakaldo, Sestao, Portugalete and Santurtzi. The main and biggest city is Barakaldo.
The right bank: A residential area, including Erandio, Leioa, and the more affluent Getxo,.
The mining zone, where the main iron ore resources were located: Muskiz, Gallarta, Ortuella
Txoriherri, wide expansion zone where the international airport and the University of the Basque Country are located.
Hego Uribe, including Basauri, Galdakao and Arrigorriaga.
Uribe-Kosta: the coastal area north of Getxo is being integrated into the metropolitan area in the recent years, with the development of low density residential areas connected by the metro.

Urban regeneration

The  Bilbao Ria 2000  corporation was founded in 1992 by the Bilbao and Barakaldo municipalities, the Greater Bilbao metropolitan area, and the Basque and Spanish Governments. The corporation's aim was to regenerate the city-planning of Bilbao and its surroundings, which were heavily punished by intense industrial contamination and decay. Among the projects this institution implemented was the recovery of Abandoibarra, once an industrial ground and now the site of the Guggenheim Museum Bilbao and the Euskalduna Palace.

In parallel to  Bilbao Ria 2000 , the Bilbao Metropoli-30 association was constituted in 1991 by the City council of Bilbao, the Biscay and Basque Governments and diverse public and private organizations for the regeneration of Metropolitan Bilbao.

The area is since 1995 fully interconnected by the Metro Bilbao.

Population of the Metropolitan Area 

Metropolitan area (35 municipalities)

Satellite towns (6 municipalities)

References 

Metropolitan areas of Spain
Estuary of Bilbao